The Cessnock Eagle and South Maitland Recorder (later published as the Cessnock Eagle) was a semiweekly English language newspaper published in Cessnock, New South Wales, Australia from 1913 to 1978.

History
First published on 21 November 1913, the last edition of the Cessnock Eagle and South Maitland Recorder was published in 1961. The paper was then published from 1961 to 1978 as the Cessnock Eagle.

Digitisation
The Cessnock Eagle and South Maitland Recorder has been digitised as part of the Australian Newspapers Digitisation Program project of the National Library of Australia.

See also
 List of newspapers in Australia
 List of newspapers in New South Wales

References

External links
 

Defunct newspapers published in New South Wales
Newspapers established in 1913
Publications disestablished in 1978
1913 establishments in Australia
1978 disestablishments in Australia
Newspapers on Trove